Joachim Fischer may refer to:

Joachim Fischer Nielsen (born 1978), badminton player from Denmark
Joachim Fischer (sociologist) (born 1951), German professor of sociology and scholar of philosophical anthropology